Bengay, spelled Ben-Gay before 1995, is a topical analgesic heat rub for temporary relief from muscle and joint pain associated with arthritis, bruises, simple backaches, overuse, sprains and strains.

Overview
Bengay was developed in France by Dr. Jules Bengué and brought to America in 1898. The name Bengué was Anglicized and commercialized to Ben-Gay (later Bengay). It was originally produced by Pfizer Consumer Healthcare, which was acquired by Johnson & Johnson. The product is advised to be used topically for adults and children 12 years of age and older, and no more than 3 to 4 times daily.

According to a study published by MIT Technology Review, the exact mechanism of its efficacy is not known. However, evidence indicates that it activates a neuron named TRPM8, which appears to keep minor pain signals in the brain from communicating with the spine.

Hazards

Bengay and similar products, such as Flexall, Mentholatum, Capzasin and Icy Hot, variously contain menthol, methyl salicylate (oil of wintergreen), and capsaicin as active ingredients and have a potential to cause first-to-third-degree chemical burns. Some people have been hospitalized after receiving such burns.

Methyl salicylate can also be toxic when excessively large doses many multiples of the recommended amount are administered, a rarity.

In October 2007 in the United States, a teenage athlete overdosed and died from overexposure to methyl salicylate, having "more than six times the safe amount of the ingredient in her body."

Active ingredients
Active ingredients vary by product version, including:

 Bengay: Original – 18.3% methyl salicylate and 16% menthol.
 Bengay: Muscle Pain/Ultra Strength – 30% methyl salicylate, 10% menthol, and 4% camphor.
 Bengay: Ice Extra Strength – 10% menthol.
 Bengay: Muscle Pain/No Odor – 15% triethanolamine salicylate.
 Bengay: Arthritis Extra Strength – 30% methyl salicylate and 8% menthol.

Other uses
Bengay can be used to remove chewing gum from clothing, as the methyl salicylate serves to loosen and diffuse the gum base.

See also

 Tiger Balm
 Heat Rub
 IcyHot
 Deep Heat
 Flexpower
 RUB A535

References

Further reading

External links
 
 Product information. DailyMed. United States National Library of Medicine.
 BenGay Topical. WebMD.

Ointments
Johnson & Johnson brands
Products introduced in 1898